Nychioptera noctuidalis is a moth in the family Erebidae. The species was first described by Harrison Gray Dyar Jr. in 1907. It is found in North America.

The MONA or Hodges number for Nychioptera noctuidalis is 8485.

References

Further reading

External links

 

Boletobiinae
Articles created by Qbugbot
Moths described in 1907